Goodwin is a town in Deuel County, South Dakota, United States, where the population was 147 at the 2020 census.

History
Goodwin was platted in 1878, when the railroad was built into the area. The town was named for George P. Goodwin, a railroad official. A post office has been in operation in Goodwin since 1878. It is still running today. On May 30th 2022, the Town was struck by a tornado that would damage many homes and businesses and would be rated EF3.

Geography

Goodwin is located at  (44.877950, -96.848924).

Goodwin has been assigned the ZIP code 57238 and the FIPS place code 24820.

Demographics

2010 census
As of the census of 2010, there were 146 people, 59 households, and 37 families residing in the town. The racial makeup of the town was 88.4% White, 9.6% from other races, and 2.1% from two or more races. Hispanic or Latino of any race were 10.3% of the population.

There were 59 households, of which 33.9% had children under the age of 18 living with them, 47.5% were married couples living together, 10.2% had a female householder with no husband present, 5.1% had a male householder with no wife present, and 37.3% were non-families. 30.5% of all households were made up of individuals, and 5.1% had someone living alone who was 65 years of age or older. The average household size was 2.47 and the average family size was 3.16.

The median age in the town was 40 years. 27.4% of residents were under the age of 18; 10.3% were between the ages of 18 and 24; 19.8% were from 25 to 44; 31.5% were from 45 to 64; and 11% were 65 years of age or older. The gender makeup of the town was 51.4% male and 48.6% female.

2000 census
As of the census of 2000, there were 160 people, 61 households, and 38 families residing in the town. The population density was 337.4 people per square mile (131.4/km2). There were 63 housing units at an average density of 132.8 per square mile (51.8/km2). The racial makeup of the town was 95.00% White, 3.12% from other races, and 1.88% from two or more races. Hispanic or Latino of any race were 3.12% of the population.

There were 61 households, out of which 34.4% had children under the age of 18 living with them, 45.9% were married couples living together, 6.6% had a female householder with no husband present, and 36.1% were non-families. 29.5% of all households were made up of individuals, and 11.5% had someone living alone who was 65 years of age or older. The average household size was 2.62 and the average family size was 3.28.

In the town, the population was spread out, with 27.5% under the age of 18, 10.6% from 18 to 24, 28.8% from 25 to 44, 20.0% from 45 to 64, and 13.1% who were 65 years of age or older. The median age was 34 years. For every 100 females, there were 119.2 males. For every 100 females age 18 and over, there were 110.9 males.

The median income for a household in the town was $34,688, and the median income for a family was $36,875. Males had a median income of $20,250 versus $22,500 for females. The per capita income for the town was $14,249. None of the families and 9.4% of the population were living below the poverty line, including no under eighteens and 18.2% of those over 64.

References

Towns in Deuel County, South Dakota
Towns in South Dakota
Populated places established in 1878
1878 establishments in Dakota Territory